The elm cultivar Ulmus 'Australis' [:'southern'], reputedly endemic to south-eastern France, Switzerland and Italy, is a little-known tree considered by various authorities to have been a variety of Ulmus minor or Ulmus × hollandica.

'Australis' is not to be confused with Loudon's U. glabra 'Australis', a variety of Wych Elm.

Description

Cultivation
Henry also mentions specimens growing in botanical gardens at Le Mans and Bordeaux, and others growing as far south as Spizza (now Sutomore) in Dalmatia (Montenegro). The tree was propagated and marketed in the UK by the Hillier & Sons nursery, Winchester, Hampshire from 1970 to 1977 when production ceased, however none were ever sold.'Australis' is not known to survive in cultivation.

Synonymy
Ulmus campestris (: procera Salisb.) var. australis.
Ulmus × hollandica 'Australis': Hilliers' Manual of Trees & Shrubs, ed. 4, p. 400, 1977, name in synonymy.
Ulmus minor 'Italica': Hilliers' Manual of Trees & Shrubs, ed. 4, p. 400, 1977, name in synonymy.

References

External links
  Sheet labelled U. campestris var. australis Henry from La Mortola, Italy (1913) 
  Sheet labelled U. campestris var. australis Henry from La Mortola, Italy (1913)

Elm cultivars
Ulmus